The 33rd annual Venice International Film Festival was held from 21 August to 3 September 1972. There was no jury because from 1969 to 1979 the festival was not competitive.

Films premiered
 The Cruel Sea by Khalid Al Siddiq (Kuwait)
 Seemabaddha by Satyajit Ray (India)
 A Clockwork Orange by Stanley Kubrick (USA)
 My Childhood by Bill Douglas (UK)
 Les deux saisons de la vie by Samy Pavel (Belgium)

Awards
Venezia Giovani Award
Best First Film - Les deux saisons de la vie (Samy Pavel)
Silver Lion
Best First Film - My Childhood by Bill Douglas
Career Golden Lion:
Charlie Chaplin, Anatoli Golovnya and Billy Wilder. 
FIPRESCI Prize
The Cruel Sea (Khalid Al Siddiq) 
Seemabaddha (Satyajit Ray)
Pasinetti Award
Best Foreign Film - A Clockwork Orange (Stanley Kubrick)

Notes
The 34th annual Venice International Film Festival was held from 26 August to 11 September 1975.
The 35th annual Venice International Film Festival was held from 24 August to 7 September 1976.

References

External links
 
 Venice Film Festival 1972 Awards on IMDb

Venice International Film Festival
Venice International Film Festival
Venice Film Festival
Film
Venice International Film Festival
Venice International Film Festival